The following is a list of notable events and releases that happened in 2014 in music in South Korea.

Notable events and achievements 

 January 16 – Exo and Psy win the Album and Digital Daesangs, respectively, at the Golden Disc Awards.
 January 23 – The 23rd Seoul Music Awards take place. Exo wins the grand prize.
 February 28 – Sunwoo Jung-a, Cho Yong-pil and Yoon Young-bae win the grand prizes at the annual Korean Music Awards.
 March 11 – With the release of Tree, TVXQ becomes the first foreign band in Japan to have three consecutive studio albums with first-week sales of over 200,000 copies, breaking Bon Jovi's thirteen-year record.
March 15 – 2NE1's Crush becomes the first album by a Korean artist to chart within the top 100 on the Billboard 200, entering at number 61. It also marked the first time two K-pop artists appeared on the chart at the same time, along with Girls' Generation's Mr.Mr.
 May 7 – Exo's Overdose records nearly 660,000 pre-orders, breaking the record at the time for most pre-orders for a single album in K-pop.
 June 12 – Taeyang's Rise becomes the highest charting album on the Billboard 200 at the time by a K-pop solo artist, peaking at number 112.
 June 23 – TVXQ become the first international artist in Japan to bring in the largest number of concertgoers in the previous three years, reaching over 2 million total attendees during the timeframe.
 July 14 – Through three concert tours in Japan since 2011, Girls' Generation attracted a cumulative total of 550,000 spectators, setting a record for a K-pop girl group.
 September 21 – Super Junior become the first Korean artist to perform a total of 100 concerts worldwide.
 September 30 – SM Entertainment announces Jessica's departure from Girls' Generation.
October 11 – "I Am the Best" by 2NE1 becomes the first song by a K-pop group to top the World Digital Song Sales chart, following its usage in Microsoft's Surface Pro 3 advertisement campaign in the US.
 November 13 – IU, g.o.d, and Taeyang win the grand prizes at the 2014 Melon Music Awards.
 November 17 – The 5th Korean Popular Culture and Arts Awards take place. Myeong Kook-hwan is awarded with the Bogwan (Precious Crown) Order of Cultural Merit; Kim Kwang-seok, I Yu-sin, Hong Seung-seong and Yoo Young-jin are awarded with the Presidential Commendation; and Jin Mi-ryeong receives the Prime Minister's Commendation.
 December 1 – Psy's "Gangnam Style" surpasses 2.15 billion views, forcing YouTube to upgrade to a 64-bit integer counter.
 December 3 – Exo and Taeyang receive the grand prizes at the 2014 MAMA.
 December 22 – Crush becomes the first K-pop album to appear on the year-end Billboard World Albums listing since the chart began in 1995.

Award shows and festivals

Award ceremonies

Festivals

Debuting and disbanded in 2014

Debuting groups

2000 Won
4L
4Ten
AKMU
Almeng
B.I.G
Badkiz
Beatwin
Berry Good
Big Byung (Hitmaker)
Bigflo
Bob Girls
Bursters
D.Holic
GD X Taeyang
Got7 
HALO
HeartB
High4
Hi Suhyun
Hotshot
Infinite F
JJCC
K-Much
Laboum
Lip Service
Lovelyz
Madtown
Mamamoo
Melody Day
Minx
Play the Siren
Rainbow Blaxx
Red Velvet
Sonamoo
Spica.S
The Barberettes
The Legend
Toheart
Troy
UNIQ
Wings
Winner
Year 7 Class 1

Solo debuts

Cheetah
Crush
Euna Kim
Gary
G2
Ha:tfelt
Heize
Hyomin
Hyoseong
J-Min
Jiyeon
Jung Seung-hwan
Kidoh
Kim Yeon-ji
Kyuhyun
Lee Michelle
Microdot
Nicole
Penomeco
Raina
Shannon
Suran
Taemin
Zico

Disbanded groups

 8Eight
 Gangkiz 
 N.EX.T
 Puretty
 She'z
 Skarf

Releases in 2014

First quarter

January

February

March

Second quarter

April

May

June

Third quarter

July

August

September

Fourth quarter

October

November

December

Deaths
Yoo Chae-yeong, 40, singer and actress
Kwon Ri-se, 23, singer (Ladies' Code)
Go Eun-bi, 21, singer (Ladies' Code)
Shin Hae-chul, 46, singer (N.EX.T)

See also
2014 in South Korea
List of South Korean films of 2014

References

 
South Korean music
K-pop